Border City Wrestling (BCW) is an independent professional wrestling promotion owned and booked by Scott D'Amore, and based in Windsor, Ontario, Canada. 

Many of the promotion's employees were trained at the Can-Am wrestling school. After the promotion briefly merged with BSE Pro to create Maximum Pro Wrestling in 2010, an offshoot promotion named after the school would be launched in 2012 before BCW would resume holding shows later that year.

History

Early years (1993–2010)
Border City Wrestling was founded in late 1992 by Scott D'Amore, Chuck Fader, and "The Canadian Destroyer" Doug Chevalier. The promotion's home base was LaSalle's Centennial Arena, with most their shows being held at this venue. The promotion was known for featuring a mix of local talent and stars from major promotions, such as WWE (then known as the World Wrestling Federation (WWF)) and Extreme Championship Wrestling (ECW) in the United States.

From 2002 to 2003, BCW had a weekly television series that was produced for Cogeco Cable and aired in several Ontario markets. In 2004, BCW would merge with Ontario Championship Wrestling (OCW). At BCW's International Incident event on September 15, 2005, Impact Wrestling (then known as Total Nonstop Action Wrestling (TNA)) founder Jeff Jarrett defeated Raven to win the NWA World Heavyweight Championship with help from D'Amore.

On February 3, 2010, it was announced that D'Amore had left TNA Wrestling and that BCW would be merging with Toronto's BSE Pro, run by Jason A. Brown, to become Maximum Pro Wrestling.  This merger would ultimately last for two years.

Revival (2012–present) 
In August 2012, an offshoot of BCW known as CAN-AM Rising debuted featuring up-and-coming talent as well as past graduates from BCW's Can-Am Wrestling School. On the debut show. Phil Atlas defeated Tyson Dux to become the new BCW Champion. In October of that year, BCW returned with its first show since breaking off from the BSE merger. One year later, on October 19, 2013, BCW held their 20th anniversary show at St. Clair College.

On May 9, 2014, BCW presented a special event titled East Meets West, featuring talent from New Japan Pro-Wrestling. The event featured appearances by Shinsuke Nakamura, Kazuchika Okada, Karl Anderson, and Hiroshi Tanahashi.

BCW's "Excellence" event, held in October 2014 and headlined by Bret Hart drew the promotion's largest crowd to date. As a result, it would become a reoccurring, annual event. The second Excellence event would be held at St. Clair College the following October in 2015.

In the Spring of 2016, BCW revived their BCW Can-Am Tag Team Championship through a tournament, which was won by Phil Atlas & Brent Banks after defeating The Fraternity at Spring Loaded 2016 on May 28, 2016. 

In March 2017, BCW formed a partnership with Japanese promotion Pro Wrestling Noah to exchange talent between Japan and Canada.

On December 5, 2017, D'Amore and Don Callis were announced as Impact Wrestling's new executive vice presidents. As a result, Impact and BCW began to work together, with content from BCW becoming available on Impact's streaming service, and most BCW events serving as television tapings for both Impact's eponymous weekly program and Xplosion.

Border City Wrestling announced their 25th Anniversary show in July 2018, on October 6 at St. Clair College. The event was filmed as part of Impact's One Night Only event series for the Global Wrestling Network.

Champions

Roster

BCW Hall of Fame 
The BCW Hall of Fame is a professional wrestling hall of fame maintained by Border City Wrestling. It was established in 2009 to honor select wrestling personalities, mostly alumni of the Ontario-based promotion. The induction ceremony for the Class of 2009, the inaugural inductees into the Hall of Fame, took place at BCW's "War Without Honour" held at the Windsor Armories on November 13, 2009. Doug Chevalier and Chuck Fader, the original co-founders of BCW along with Scott D'Amore in 1992, led the class, along with other former BCW "originals".

 – Entries without a birth name indicates that the inductee did not perform under a ring name.
 – This section mainly lists the major accomplishments of each inductee in the promotion.

References

External links

 
Entertainment companies established in 1993
Entertainment companies disestablished in 2010
Entertainment companies established in 2012
Canadian companies established in 1993
Canadian companies disestablished in 2010
Canadian companies established in 2012
Companies based in Windsor, Ontario
Professional wrestling in Ontario
1993 establishments in Ontario
2010 disestablishments in Ontario
2012 establishments in Ontario